Jasmin Bhasin (born 28 June 1990) is an Indian actress and model who works in Hindi television along with Punjabi films. She made her debut in 2011 Tamil film Vaanam. Bhasin is best known for playing Twinkle Taneja in Tashan-e-Ishq (2015-16) and Teni Bhanushali in Dil Se Dil Tak (2017-18). She also participated in reality shows like Khatron Ke Khiladi 9 , Fear Factor: Khatron Ke Khiladi – Made in India  and Bigg Boss 14.
 
Her other notable works include portraying Happy mehra in Dil Toh Happy Hai Ji and Nayantara in Naagin 4: Bhagya Ka Zehreela Khel. Bhasin made her Punjabi film debut opposite Gippy Grewal in comedy drama Honeymoon (2022).

Early and personal life
Bhasin was born to a Sikh family in Kota, Rajasthan on 28 June 1990. She completed her schooling from Kota and graduated from a hospitality college in Jaipur.

Bhasin met actor Aly Goni during Fear Factor: Khatron Ke Khiladi 9 in 2018. Later the two begun dating each other in 2021 after appearing in Bigg Boss 14.

Career

Early career (2011–2015) 
Bhasin started her acting career with the Tamil film Vaanam in 2011. She then acted in a few more South Indian films like Malayalam film Beware of Dogs (2014) Telugu films Veta (2014) and Ladies & Gentlemen (2015).

In August 2015, she made her television debut with Zee TV's popular romantic Tashan-e-Ishq as Twinkle Taneja opposite Zain Imam and Sidhant Gupta.

Breakthrough & recognition (2017–2019) 

In January 2017, she was seen portraying Teni Bhanushali in Colors TV's love triangle show Dil Se Dil Tak opposite Sidharth Shukla and Rashami Desai. The show went off air in June 2018.

She made her reality debut through participating in the stunt-based show Fear Factor: Khatron Ke Khiladi 9 where she finished at 7th place. From January 2019, she began portraying Happy Mehra in StarPlus's Dil Toh Happy Hai Ji in June 2019, she got replaced by Donal Bisht.

In December 2019, she starred in Ekta Kapoor's popular supernatural franchise Naagin 4: Bhagya Ka Zehreela Khel portraying Nayantara Alongside Vijayendra Kumeria and Nia Sharma on Colors TV until her role ended two months later in February 2020 and Rashami Desai joins in with the same role.

In August 2020, she participated 2nd time in Colors TV's stunt-based reality show Khatron Ke Khiladi - Made In India where she finished at 3rd place.

Rise to prominence (2020–present) 

In October 2020, she participated in Colors TV's reality show Bigg Boss 14 where she ended up at 11th position.

In 2021, she did several Hindi and Punjabi music videos with channel such as T-Series, Desi Music Factory and Saregama.

In January 2022, Bhasin started shooting for her first Punjabi film Honeymoon opposite Gippy Grewal in Chandigarh, filming completed in London in April 2022, and the film released on 25 October 2022.

In the media 
Bhasin was ranked in The Times of India's Most Desirable Women of Indian Television at No. 16 in 2018, No. 12 in 2019 and No. 3 in 2020.

Filmography

Films

Television

Special appearances

Web series

Music videos

Awards and nominations

References

External links

1990 births
Living people
People from Kota, Rajasthan
Indian Sikhs
Indian film actresses
Indian television actresses
Actresses in Tamil cinema
Actresses in Kannada cinema
Actresses in Malayalam cinema
Actresses in Telugu cinema
Actresses in Punjabi cinema
Actresses in Hindi television
Female models from Rajasthan
Fear Factor: Khatron Ke Khiladi participants
Bigg Boss (Hindi TV series) contestants
21st-century Indian actresses